Columbia Heights may refer to one of these United States locations:

 Columbia Heights (Washington, D.C.), a neighborhood of Washington, D.C.
 Columbia Heights (WMATA station), a Metro station in Washington, D.C.
 Columbia Heights, Minnesota, a city in Anoka County
 Columbia Heights, Brooklyn, a street in New York City
 Columbia Heights (Oregon), a mountain in Umatilla County near Milton-Freewater
 Columbia Heights, Columbia County, Oregon, a populated place near St. Helens, Oregon